Killer Magic is a British reality television series that shows five magicians competing against each other in tasks. A pilot aired on 1 April 2014 with a full series to follow on 24 March 2015. It is narrated by Matt Edmondson.

The five contestants taking part in the pilot are Ben Hart, Dee Christopher, Damien O'Brien, Jasz Vegas and Chris Cox.

Production
The series was commissioned by Zai Bennett and Alan Tyler, and made by Objective Productions. Anthony Owen is the creator and also one of the executive producers. The other executive producer is Andrew Newman and the producer is Toby Stevens. A pilot episode was filmed and all six episodes were due to be shot in front of a studio audience. However, the full series is instead presented identically to the pilot with guests invited for each trick and the only audience being the contestants themselves.

Transmissions

International broadcast
The series premiered in Australia on 3 April 2015 on FOX8.

References

External links
 
 
 

2010s British game shows
2014 British television series debuts
2015 British television series endings
British television magic series
BBC television game shows
English-language television shows
Television series by All3Media
Television shows set in the United Kingdom